Alfred Talbot Cliff (27 October 1878 – 25 January 1966) was an English first-class cricketer. Holding amateur status, Cliff was a right-handed batsman and slow left arm bowler who played 39 times for Worcestershire between 1912 and 1920. He scored 986 runs at 13.69 and took eight wickets, though never more than one in a single innings: his first scalp, when playing against Kent, was England Test batsman Frank Woolley.

Cliff was born in Scawby Grove, Brigg, Lincolnshire; he died in Oxford at the age of 87.

External links
 
 Statistical summary from CricketArchive

English cricketers
Worcestershire cricketers
1878 births
1966 deaths
People from Brigg